The 1892–93 FA Cup was the 22nd staging of the world's oldest football cup competition, the Football Association Challenge Cup, commonly known as the FA Cup. Wolverhampton Wanderers won the competition, beating Everton 1–0 in the final at Fallowfield Stadium for the only time (moved from Kennington Oval), with Wembley Stadium still 30 years away from being built. Wolves continued the recent Midlands dominance of the FA Cup, after the success of West Brom, Aston Villa and Nottingham Forest the previous season.

Matches were scheduled to be played at the stadium of the team named first on the date specified for each round, which was always a Saturday. Some matches, however, might be rescheduled for other days if there were clashes with games for other competitions or the weather was inclement. If scores were level after 90 minutes had been played, a replay would take place at the stadium of the second-named team later the same week. If the replayed match was drawn further replays would be held until a winner was determined. If scores were level after 90 minutes had been played in a replay, a 30-minute period of extra time would be played.

Calendar

Results

First round proper

Second round proper

Third round proper

Semi-finals

Final
 

The Final was  played on 25 March 1893 at Fallowfield Stadium. The final was contested by Wolverhampton Wanderers and Everton. Wolves won 1-0, with a single goal from Harry Allen.

Match details

References
General
The FA Cup Archive at TheFA.com
English FA Cup 1892/93 at Soccerbase

Specific

1892-93
1892–93 in English football
FA